15th FAI World Rally Flying Championship took place between July 26 – July 31, 2006 in Troyes in France, altogether with the 17th FAI World Precision Flying Championship (July 21–26).

There were 65 crews from France (8), Poland (6), Czech Republic (5), United Kingdom (5), Spain (5), Hungary (5), South Africa (5), Russia (4), Austria (3), Germany (3), Greece (3), Italy (3), Chile (3), Cyprus (2), Israel (2), Slovakia (1), Portugal (1) and 1 mixed.

Most popular airplane was Cessna 152 (31 crews) and Cessna 172 (25), then DR400 (4), Cessna 150 (3), 3Xtrim (2), PZL Wilga 2000 (2), Glastar (1), HB-23 (1), Piper PA-28-180 Cherokee (1), DV-20 (1) (these numbers of aircraft are initial, while number of participating crews was in fact lower - 65).

Contest
July 15 and July 17 to July 21 - unofficial practice
July 21 to July 26  - the 17th FAI World Precision Flying Championship
July 24 to July 26 - unofficial practice
July 26 - Final arrivals, opening briefing and opening ceremony
July 27 - Official practice
July 28 - Landing test
July 29 - First competition flight
July 30 - Second First competition flight
July 31 - Reserve day, awards giving and closing ceremony
August 1 - Departures

Results

Individual 

Pilot / navigator / country / aircraft / registration / observation + navigation + landings penalty points = total

Team
Two best crews were counted.

 - 394 (number of penalty points)
 - 460
 - 476
 -  1010
 - 1700
 - 1756
 - 2226
 - 2256
 - 2526
 - 2546
 - 3956
 - 4760
 - 4956
 - 8860
 - 9574

External links
FAI - Official result

Rally Flying 15
Fédération Aéronautique Internationale
FAI World Rally Flying Championship
FAI World Rally Flying Championship
Aviation history of France